Klaus Kristian Snellman (20 March 1924 Helsinki – 25 June 2003 Helsinki) was a Finnish diplomat, a Bachelor of Political Science. He was an Ambassador in 1976–1980 in Lima and Manila between 1980 and 1984 and then a negotiating officer of the Ministry for Foreign Affairs until 1986 when he was appointed Ambassador to Sofia, where he remained until his retirement in 1990.

References 

Ambassadors of Finland to Bulgaria
Diplomats from Helsinki
1924 births
2003 deaths
Ambassadors of Finland to Peru
Ambassadors of Finland to the Philippines